"Still on Your Side" is a song by British pop rock band BBMak. It was released as the second single from their debut studio album, Sooner or Later (2000), in the US on 5 November 2000 and in the band's native UK on 14 May 2001. Having previously achieved success in the American market first with their single "Back Here", 
"Still on Your Side" was BBMak's second top 10 hit in the UK. In the US, the song charted in the number 54 position on the Hot 100 chart, number 40 on the Adult Top 40 chart, and 14 on the Mainstream Top 40 chart.

Background
Stephen McNally said "Still on Your Side" sounds like an anthem song, adding, "It's a song we wrote in Los Angeles and it's already been a big hit for us in America. You could imagine it being played at the World Cup with thousands of football fans singing along to it".

The song is written by Bridget Benenate, Bob Thiele Jr., and Dillon O'Brian, in addition to the three members of BBMak.

Release
The single was originally planned to be released in the UK on 6 December 1999, but its commercial release was cancelled.  A remixed version of the song was released in the U.S. on 5 November 2000. This remix was then released in the UK on 14 May 2001 and reached number 8 on the UK Singles Chart that same month.

Reception
Billboard wrote the song is “a joyful all-out anthem” and “has a lyric to connect with the masses, the hooks to again reel in BBMak’s younger fans, and the elegance and credible instrumentation to draw the attention of adults”. Writing retrospectively about the song, Can't Stop the Pop said Still on Your Side is a terrific follow-up that amply demonstrates BBMak's debut single was no fluke. The group was smartly pitched; they toured extensively with Britney Spears and *NSYNC, which neatly aligned them to the bubblegum pop demographic. However, they had a rockier sound and played their own instruments, which is precisely where that market was heading. Thus, Still on Your Side was so right for the time and perfectly brought together all of those elements. There was enough boyband appeal about BBMak to tap into that market, but their music was packaged in a way that could credibly appeal to mainstream and adult contemporary radio. Additionally, the song is said to be "a welcome opportunity to cut loose with some triumphant ad-libs ('Don’t you know that I’m still on your si-i-i-ide') and screeching electric guitar riffs".

Music videos

The first music video was filmed in the USA. It is set in a New York City street and opens with two Italian-American moving men trying to lift a wardrobe up to an apartment. The camera pans into one of the apartments where BBMak is performing the song. Throughout the video, each member of BBMak are able to save a woman from accidental injury. Christian pulls a woman out of the way of the falling wardrobe, Mark pulls a woman from the path of a stray baseball from a neighborhood kids' game, and Ste jumps in front of a woman before she can walk into incoming traffic. The video ends with people from the neighborhood singing along to the song.

The second music video is set in the UK, reflecting the band's roots. It was filmed in London and directed by Dani Jacobs. The video opens with a montage of shots of the House of Parliament, Regent Street, and a London Underground sign. A woman named Mia leaves a message on an answering machine, saying she wants to meet as soon as possible. The intended recipient of Mia's message is not shown, but each member of BBMak is shown receiving the message and believing it is meant for each of them, respectively. Each member gets in a Mini Cooper to drive to London and meet Mia in time. The three band members all reach their destination at the same time and have a laugh. This storyline is interspersed with footage of the band playing before a live audience inside a studio.  The video had its world premiere on 20 November 2000 in an episode of MTV's Making the Video. It reached the number 4 spot on TRL that month.

Credits and personnel
Credits are adapted from the UK CD1 liner notes.

Locations
 Recorded at Hollywood Studios (Hollywood, California)
 Mixed at Royaltone Studios (California)
 Artwork designed at Blade

BBMak
 Christian Burns – writing
 Mark Barry – writing
 Stephen McNally – writing

Other personnel
 Bridget Benenate – writing
 Bob Thiele Jr. - writing
 Dillon O'Brian – writing
 Chris Lord-Alge – mixing
 Mark Jolley – A&R direction

Charts

Weekly charts

References

2000 songs
2000 singles
BBMak songs
Hollywood Records singles
Songs written by Christian Burns
Telstar Records singles